Anna Emelia Elisa Wengberg (1865–1936) was a Swedish painter specializing in portraits who was a member of the Önningeby artists colony on the Finnish island of Åland. Her works are in the collections of the National Museum of Fine Arts in Stockholm and the Helsingborg Museum.

Biography
Born on 24 April 1865 in Ystad, Sweden, Wengberg was the daughter of Per August Wengberg and Emilia Sophia Carlheim-Gyllensköld. She studied under Edvard Perséus in Stockholm (ca. 1884) and Bengt Nordenberg in Düsseldorf as well as in Paris. From 1890 to 1894 she lived in Finland.

Wengberg first exhibited in 1903, often painting brightly coloured portraits. She became an active member of the Önningeby artists colony on the island of Åland where she became a friend of Eva Acke. Her 1893 painting of Önningeby shows Acke strolling with J.A.G. Acke, her husband to be. She returned to Önningeby as late as 1920 as evidenced by one of her paintings.

References

1865 births
1936 deaths
People from Ystad
Swedish painters
Swedish women artists
Swedish expatriates in Finland